José Aragón Escacena (born 1891 in Astorga, (León Province), Spain; died 1945 in Spain) was a Leonese language writer.

He wrote "Entre Brumas", edited in 1921 and awarded in the IX Century of Leonese "Fueros" (Laws).

Books 

 Entre Brumas (1921)

See also 
 List of Leonese language writers
 Leonese language
 Kingdom of León

External links
 
 Top Level Domain for Leonese language, in Leonese language, English, Spanish, French, Italian and so oder

1891 births
1945 deaths
People from Astorga, Spain
Leonese-language writers